Ewald "Wally" Warning (born in Aruba, Netherlands Antilles) is a roots, reggae, ragga, gospel and Latin singer living in Munich, Germany. He is the son of Surinamese parents. At the age of 17, he moved from Aruba to the Netherlands, where he had a hit single with "The World Needs Love" in the early 1980s and around 1990 to Germany. He put his singing career on hold while he played bass guitar in touring bands with Sam & Dave and Lightnin' Hopkins, but restarted his solo career in the 2000s. He reached a broad audience when he produced and sang the radio summer hit "No Monkey". The song reached the top thirty in both Austria and Germany.

Discography

Maxi-singles
 1983: "Promises"
 1984: "Land of Hunger"
 2003: "Cosa Linda"
 2007: "No Monkey"
2008: "Hand in Hand"
2008: "un Amor"
2010: "Lo Que Busco"
2011: "positive"
2011: "one drop Reggae"
2014:"the world needs Love"
2015: "success"
2016: "Abrázame"
2018: "Live to Love"
2019: "Do it"

Albums
 Tax
 1992: Promises
 1995: Love Can Save Us
 1997: Storm
 1998: Hope
 1999: Reggae Vibe
 2004: Who Am I
 2005: Spiritual Soul
2005: "Reggae Vibe II"
 2006: Slow Down
 2007: No Monkey
 2008: Hope (Gospel album)
 2009: Take life
 2010: Closer (Gospel album)
2010: Aya
2012: "Mama Nature"
2013: "Dushi  Ritmo"
2015: "Footsteps"

References

External links

 Official homepage
Facebook
Reverbnation
Spotify
Instagram
iTunes
Official Youtube channel

Year of birth missing (living people)
Living people
Aruban singers
Reggae musicians
Aruban people of Surinamese descent
Aruban emigrants to Germany
21st-century German male singers